Landis Power Station is a natural gas-fired station owned by SaskPower, located in Landis, Saskatchewan, Canada and operated as a peaking plant.

Description 

The Landis Station consists of:
 1 - 79 MW unit, commissioned in 1975 and refurbished in 1999.

See also 

 SaskPower

References

External links 
 SaskPower Station Description

Natural gas-fired power stations in Saskatchewan
SaskPower
Reford No. 379, Saskatchewan